Pike-Delta-York Local School District is a school district in Northwest Ohio. The school district serves students who live in the village of Delta, as well as the surrounding rural areas located in Fulton County. The superintendent is  Dr. Ted Haselman.

Grades 9-12
Delta High School

Grades 6-8
Delta Middle School

Grades K-5
Delta Elementary School

External links
District Website

School districts in Ohio
Education in Fulton County, Ohio